Doris "Doc" Leeper (April 4, 1929 – April 11, 2000) was an American sculptor and painter from New Smyrna Beach, Florida. She was instrumental in the creation of the Canaveral National Seashore in 1975, and the Spruce Creek Preserve, renamed the Doris Leeper Spruce Creek Preserve in memoriam. She founded the Atlantic Center for the Arts in 1982. She was inducted into the Florida Artists Hall of Fame in 1999.

Leeper was born on April 4, 1929, in Charlotte, North Carolina. She attended Duke University, originally intending to become a brain surgeon – the origin of her nickname "Doc." She eventually graduated in 1951 with a degree in art history.

In 1958, while working in the field of commercial art, she moved to the small community of Eldora, Florida, situated on a barrier island between New Smyrna Beach and Titusville, Florida. As a result of her presence there, Leeper became increasingly interested in environmental preservation. By 1961, she had become a full-time artist, specializing in painting and sculpture. Her work is in over 100 collections in the U.S. and abroad.

By the early 1970s, Leeper was a well-known figure in the Florida environmental movement, and was instrumental in the 1975 creation of the Canaveral National Seashore (CANA), which encompassed the island on which Eldora was located. In 1975 she founded Friends of Canaveral and appointed to the Canaveral National Seashore Advisory Commission where she pushed for wilderness protection for the seashore. 

Leeper conceived of the Atlantic Center for the Arts in 1977, envisioning it as a Florida artist-in-residence program in which artists of all disciplines could work with current prominent artists in a supportive and creative environment. Leeper saw the potential for an artist's residency as a place for ideas to be created, shared, and come into fruition. She soon persuaded friends and community members to join in her vision. In 1979, she convinced the Rockefeller Foundation to provide a challenge grant that soon was matched. This $25,000 in seed money was the unofficial inception of the ACA. When a prime piece of property became available on the shores of Turnbull Bay, a tidal estuary west of New Smyrna Beach, Leeper raised the $50,000 necessary to buy the ten-acre plot. Three years later, five main buildings were completed. Over the years, five more buildings were constructed and an additional 59 acres were purchased as preserve land.

The ACA officially opened in 1982 for the first residency with author James Dickey, sculptor Duane Hanson, and composer David Del Tredici. Since then, over 155 interdisciplinary residencies have taken place, featuring over 430 Master Artists and over 3,500 Associate Artists from around the world.

Leeper was awarded honorary doctorates from Duke and from Stetson University. She was named Florida ambassador of the arts, and inducted into the Florida Hall of Fame in 1999.  A 45-year retrospective of her work was held at Cornell Fine Arts Museum in 1995.

She died April 11, 2000 as the last resident of Eldora. After her death, the management of the town was officially turned over to the federal government, as the town is located more than two miles within the borders of the Canaveral National Seashore. The town claims no permanent residents and visitation is limited and subject to park hours. Only two of its original buildings remain. In 2020, Leeper's house was listed on the National Register of Historic Places.

Quotes

References

External links
 Lee Corbino Galleries – Doris Leeper Museums and Public Collections
Doris Leeper Papers, University of Central Florida

1929 births
2000 deaths
Duke University alumni
People from Volusia County, Florida
20th-century American painters
20th-century American sculptors
20th-century American women artists
Artists from Charlotte, North Carolina
People from New Smyrna Beach, Florida
Sculptors from North Carolina